Winnebago County is the name of three counties in the United States:

Winnebago County, Illinois
Winnebago County, Iowa
Winnebago County, Wisconsin